Microsoft V-Chat is a freeware 3D chat program released in December 1995 by Microsoft. V-Chat is a multi-user social chat client that lets people interact online from within a 2D or 3D multimedia environment using graphical representations of themselves known as avatars. V-Chat avatars have a full range of gestures that allow users to fully express themselves online. V-Chat enables users to select from a wide variety of existing avatars, or create custom avatars using the V-Chat Avatar Wizard. Sounds, animations, and visual imagery create mood and context for these graphical social environments.

It has now been discontinued; it can still be downloaded from other sites, such as download.com.  V-Chat was just an experimental precursor to a more ambitious projected called V-Worlds, which was completed but never widely deployed.

See also 
 Microsoft Comic Chat

References

External links 
Internet Wayback machine Microsoft V-Chat page Archive
Microsoft V-Chat page - Microsoft Chat pages
Drucker, Steven M. Shelly D. Farnham, and Marc A. Smith. "The Social Life of Small Graphical Chat Spaces." (Word, Archive)
Chapter from the book "Avatars!" about Microsoft V-Chat
Lessons Learned: Social Interaction in Virtual Environments: Study conducted on Microsoft V-Chat
Download Version 2.0 of V-Chat at Tucows
Download Version 2.0 at the Internet Archive

Discontinued Microsoft software
1995 software